Erich Pascal Malkemper (born 24 June 1985) is a German neuroscientist. He studies magnetoreception and animal hearing and he is currently a group leader of the Max Planck Society at the Center of Advanced European Studies and Research (CAESAR) in Bonn, Germany.

Education 
Malkemper studied neurobiology at the Ruhr University Bochum. He received his MSc degree there in 2011. His PhD in Duisburg-Essen was followed by a postdoctoral position with David A. Keays at the Research Institute of Molecular Pathology (IMP) in Vienna, Austria.

Research achievements 
In 2014 Malkemper showed that woodmice have a radio-frequency dependent magnetic sense. As well in 2014, he received an Ig Nobel Prize for his work on magnetoreception in dogs. Furthermore, he provided support for the absence of magnetite magnetoreceptors in the inner ear. Such receptors had been previously hypothesized at this location, because of the presence of iron rich hair organelles in the inner ear of birds.  

In 2020 Malkemper was awarded and ERC Start grant valued at 1.5 million euros to investigate magnetoreception in rodents.

References 

1985 births
Living people
Ruhr University Bochum alumni
University of Duisburg-Essen alumni
German neuroscientists